Thamiscus or Thamiskos was a town of the Chalcidice, in ancient Macedonia. In the year 323 BCE, it was one of the cities delivered by Alexander the Great to the Macedonians. Its site is unlocated.

References

Populated places in ancient Macedonia
Former populated places in Greece
Geography of ancient Chalcidice
Lost ancient cities and towns